April2015

The Mediterranean Bank Network is a  partnership between Mediterranean banks. It was established on 28 November 1996  to encourage inter-regional commercial and business relationships. Member banks have a virtual presence in all the member countries  as well as presence through bank representative offices and subsidiaries. 
The presidency of the network rotates every two years and is currently held by Mr Hassan El Basri and Timothy Anvarov representing Banque Centrale Populaire Maroc 

Banking organizations